Reggie Dwayne Johnson (born August 28, 1966) is an American former professional boxer who competed from 1984 to 2008. He is a two-weight world champion, having held the WBA middleweight title from 1992 to 1993, and the IBF light heavyweight title from 1998 to 1999.

Professional career
Johnson made his professional debut in 1984. He won the WBA Inter-Continental middleweight title in 1989, and the USBA middleweight title in 1990, before losing a disputed split decision in 1991 against James Toney for the IBF and lineal middleweight titles, a fight in which he notably knocked Toney down in the second round.

In 1992 he won his first world championship by winning the vacant WBA middleweight title in a close decision over Steve Collins. After three successful defenses, including a decision over the undefeated Lamar Parks, Johnson lost the belt to fellow southpaw John David Jackson. He twice failed in attempts to regain the WBA title, both by hotly disputed decisions to Jorge Castro in Argentina.

He later moved up to light heavyweight, winning the IBF title in 1998 against the undefeated William Guthrie with a rare one-punch knockout in the fifth round, a fight in which Guthrie left the ring on a stretcher. Johnson defended the title twice before losing by a wide decision to Roy Jones Jr. in a unification bout for the WBA and WBC titles in 1999.

In 2001, Johnson returned to boxing and won the NABF and USBA light heavyweight titles, which he then lost in 2002 following a close decision to Antonio Tarver in an IBF world title eliminator. At age 35, Johnson then retired.

He returned in 2005 for one fight, then in 2008 Johnson scored a split decision win over former light heavyweight world champion Julio César González.

Professional boxing record

References

External links

1966 births
Living people
Boxers from Houston
World Boxing Association champions
International Boxing Federation champions
American male boxers
World middleweight boxing champions
World light-heavyweight boxing champions
Southpaw boxers
Middleweight boxers
Light-heavyweight boxers